Great Mosque or the Great Mosque of Nedroma is a historic mosque in the city of Nedroma, about 77km from Tlemcen, Algeria. The mosque was founded in 1145 and contains the earliest surviving Almoravid minbar.

Architecture
The mosque, as is with the other Almoravid religious buildings of the same era, follows the similar construction plan. The plan consists of a rectangular sahn in the middle surrounded by walls and a nave perpendicular with the qibla wall. The prayer hall contains nine naves equally distributed to the south of the central nave. Three naves are connected to the short side of the sahn and forming a gallery. The longest side of the sahn runs parallel with the qibla wall and it is enclosed by the gallery.

From the top, the building is rectangular shaped and covered with the roof of tiled slopes which are parallel to one another. The central roof is slightly wider and ends with a cross vault above the mihrab. Horseshoe arch rests on the pillars which divide the naves. The mihrab does not contain any decorations. The minaret did not exist initially, and it was added later in 1348 according to the scripture available inside the prayer hall.

The date of construction is inscribed on the minbar commissioned specifically for the mosque, and on the part of the marble which is used for the minaret.

See also
  Lists of mosques 
  List of mosques in Africa
  List of mosques in Algeria

References

Bibliography
Bourouiba, R., Apports de l’Algérie à l’architecture religieuse arabo-islamique, Alger : OPNA, 1956.
Marçais, G., L’architecture musulmane d’occident, Tunisie, Algérie, Espagne et Sicile, Paris : Arts et Métiers Graphiques, 1957, p. 87.

12th-century mosques
Mosques in Tlemcen
Almoravid architecture